Tollington School (1901-1967) was a selective, coeducational grammar school in Muswell Hill, London, England. For the present school on this site, see Fortismere School.

Foundation
Tollington School of Muswell Hill, North London N10, was the final manifestation of Tollington Park College, a private educational establishment for boys founded by William Brown in 1879 in Tollington Park, London N4. The success and increasing complement of the college soon outgrew its home. Rapid population expansion around Muswell Hill created the need for a new school and the opportunity was seen by the founder's son Campbell Brown; in 1901 he established Tollington Boys School in Tetherdown, Muswell Hill.

Tollington High School
In 1910 Tollington High School for girls was opened by Campbell Brown in nearby Collingwood Avenue. In 1919 both schools were purchased by London County Council, the local education authority. Aside from the senior management, the two schools operated independently.

Tollington Grammar School
In 1957, boys and girls came together in Tollington School, a coeducational grammar school and a new building was erected on the playing fields of the boys school, opening in 1959. In 1967 Tollington and the neighbouring William Grimshaw secondary modern schools were merged to become Creighton (comprehensive) School and the original names expired.

The buildings are still in use today: the 100+ year-old original buildings and 1957 development in Tetherdown are now occupied by Fortismere School; the Collingwood Avenue site now houses Tetherdown Primary.

Distinguished alumni
 Felix Aprahamian, classical music concert organiser
 Jennifer Bate OBE, concert organist
 Kenneth Biggs GC
 Edwin York Bowen, English composer and pianist
 Michael Casson OBE, potter
 Sir Henry Hallett Dale, President of the Royal Society and Nobel prizewinner
 Ted Dicks, composer, incl. "Right Said Fred" and "A Windmill in Old Amsterdam"
 Chris Gilbey, music industry executive and composer
 Mark Hollis, lead singer of Talk Talk
 W. J. MacQueen-Pope, theatre historian
 Maurice Saatchi, Baron Saatchi, co-founder the advertising agency Saatchi and Saatchi 
 Sir John Sorrell CBE, designer, Chairman of the Design Council, 1994-2000
 Richard Speaight - society photographer
 Rudolf Uhlenhaut, engineer, responsible for the Mercedes 300SLR Gull Wing
 Prof Ann Wakefield, née Zaudy, microbiologist
 Anne Weyman OBE, Chief Executive of the Family Planning Association, 1996-2008
 Professor Anton Weinberg Distinguished Teacher: The White House Commission on Presidential Scholars. ARAM: ARCM: LRAM.

Old Tollingtonians Society
Tollington Schools are actively remembered by ex-pupils and staff, members of the Old Tollingtonians Society. The society preserves records and memorabilia of the school. Members of the society meet annually for a reunion in the assembly hall of the school (now Fortismere).

References

Defunct grammar schools in England
Defunct schools in the London Borough of Haringey
Educational institutions disestablished in 1967
Educational institutions established in 1879
Educational institutions established in 1901
1879 establishments in England
1901 establishments in England